Methyl-n-amylnitrosamine (MNAN) is a potential carcinogen  It is metabolized in the liver by the enzyme CYP2A6.

References

Carcinogens
Nitrosamines